The Apameini are a mid-sized tribe of moths in the Noctuinae subfamily (formerly in the Hadeninae subfamily).

Selected genera
Achatodes Guenée, 1852
Agroperina Hampson, 1908
Apamea Ochsenheimer, 1816
Archanara Walker, 1866
Cherokeea Quinter & Sullivan, 2014
Crymodes Guenée, 1841
Eremobina McDunnough, 1937
Helotropha Lederer, 1857
Hydraecia Guenée, 1841
Hypocoena Hampson, 1908
Luperina Boisduval, 1829
Macronoctua Grote, 1874
Minigrapta Kononenko & Matov, 2012
Oligia Hübner, 1821
Papaipema Smith, 1899
Parastichtis Hübner, 1821
Trichoplexia Hampson, 1908

References
 ITIS standard report page